

Jordanian Honours 

 Queen Noor of Jordan
  Grand Cordon with collar of the Order of al-Hussein bin Ali (5.6.1978)
  Special Grand Cordon of the Supreme Order of the Renaissance (5.6.1978)
 Abdullah II of Jordan
  Grand Master of the Order of al-Hussein bin Ali
  Grand Master of the Supreme Order of the Renaissance
  Grand Master of the Order of the Star of Jordan
  Grand Master of the Order of Independence
 Queen Rania of Jordan
  Grand Cordon with collar of the Order of al-Hussein bin Ali (9.6.1999)
 Hussein, Crown Prince of Jordan
  Knight of the Order of the Star of Jordan
 Princess Alia bint Hussein, daughter of Queen Dina of Jordan, half-sister of Abdullah II of Jordan  Grand Cordon of the Order of the Star of Jordan
 1st class of Al-Hussein Decoration for Distinguished Contribution (5.2.2007)
 Prince Faisal bin Hussein, son of Princess Muna of Jordan, full-blood brother of Abdullah II of Jordan
  Grand Cordon of the Order of al-Hussein bin Ali
  Grand Cordon of the Supreme Order of the Renaissance
  Special Grand Cordon of the Order of the Star of Jordan
  Grand Cordon of the Order of Independence (Jordan)
 Grand Cordon of the Hussein Order of Military Merit
 Medals for Long Service, Administration & Technical Competence, Administrative & Leadership Competence, Training Competence, etc. ...
 Princess Aisha bint Hussein, daughter of Princess Muna of Jordan, full-blood sister of Abdullah II of Jordan and twin sister of Princess Zein
  Grand Cordon of the Order of the Star of Jordan
  Grand Cordon of the Order of Independence
 Al-Hussein Order of Military Merit 4th class
 King Hussein Medal of Excellence
 Medals for Administrative & Leadership Competence and Administrative & Technical Competence
 Princess Zein bint Hussein, daughter of Princess Muna of Jordan, full-blood sister of Abdullah II of Jordan and twin sister of Princess Aisha
  Grand Cordon of the Order of the Star of Jordan
  Grand Cordon of the Order of Independence
 Medal for Administrative & Leadership Competence
 Princess Haya bint Hussein, daughter of Queen Alia of Jordan, half-sister of Abdullah II of Jordan
  Special Grand Cordon of the Supreme Order of the Renaissance (30.1.2006)
 Prince Ali bin Hussein, Son of Queen Alia of Jordan, half-brother of Abdullah II of Jordan
  Grand Cordon of the Order of al-Hussein bin Ali
  Grand Cordon of the Supreme Order of the Renaissance
  Grand Cordon of the Order of the Star of Jordan
  Grand Cordon of the Order of Independence
 Al Hussein Order of Military Merit 4th class
 King Hussein Medal of Excellence 
 Medals for Administration & Technical Competence, Administrative & Leadership Competence, Training Competence, etc.
 Princess Rym al-Ali, Ali's wife
  Grand Cordon of the Order of the Star of Jordan
 Prince Hamzah bin Hussein, son of Queen Noor of Jordan, half-brother of Abdullah II of Jordan
  Grand Cordon of the Supreme Order of the Renaissance (November 1995)
  Grand Cordon of the Order of the Star of Jordan (November 1995)
  Grand Cordon of the Order of Independence
 4th class of the Al-Hussein Order of Military Merit
 Princess Noor Hamzah, Hamzah's wife
  Grand Cordon of the Order of the Star of Jordan
 Prince Hashim bin Hussein, son of Queen Noor of Jordan, half-brother of Abdullah II of Jordan
  Grand Cordon of the Order of the Star of Jordan
 1st class of the Al-Hussein Order of Military Merit 
 King Hussein Medal of Excellence (10.6.2000)
 Medals for Administrative & Leadership Competence and Administrative & Technical Competence
 Princess Firyal al-Mohammad, Muhammad's first wife
  Grand Cordon of the Order of Independence (Jordan)
 Prince Talal bin Muhammad, elder son of Muhammad bin Talal
  Grand Cordon of the Order of the Star of Jordan
 Grand Cordon of the Order of Independence (Jordan)
 Princess Ghida Talal, Talal's wife
  Grand Cordon of the Order of the Star of Jordan
 Grand Cordon of the Order of Independence (Jordan)
 Prince Ghazi bin Muhammad, younger son of Muhammad bin Talal
  Grand Cordon of the Supreme Order of the Renaissance (9.10.2003)
  Grand Cordon of the Order of the Star of Jordan (13.11.1995)
 Al-Hussein Distinguished Service Medal 1st class (24.8.1999)
 and Education Medal 1st class (5.10.2004)
 Prince Hassan bin Talal, youngest brother of King Hussein of Jordan
  Order of al-Hussein bin Ali (20.3.1987)
  Special Grand Cordon of the Supreme Order of the Renaissance
  Grand Cordon of the Order of the Star of Jordan
  Grand Cordon of the Order of Independence (Jordan)
 King Hussein Silver Jubilee Medal (1977)
 1967–1971 Service Medal-1971
 the Great Ramadan War (1973) Medal
 Princess Sarvath al-Hassan, Hassan's wife
  Special Grand Cordon of the Supreme Order of the Renaissance (al-Nahda) (8.1994)
 Princess Rahma bint Hassan, Hassan's elder daughter
  Grand Cordon of the Order of Independence (Jordan)
 Mr. Ala'a Al Batayneh, Princess Rahma's husband
  Grand Cordon of the Order of Independence (Jordan)
 Sayyid Nasser Judeh, Hassan's younger daughter Princess Princess Badiya bint Hassan's husband
  Grand Cordon of the Order of Independence (Jordan)
 Prince Rashid bin Hassan, Hassan's son
 Grand Cordon of the Al-Hussein Order of Military Merit (1996)
 Al-Hussein Military Medal 1st class (14.11.1996)
 Medals of Administrative & Leadership Competence, and Administrative and Technical Competence
 Princess Basma bint Talal, sister of King Hussein of Jordan
  Special Grand Cordon of the Supreme Order of the Renaissance (7.1994)
 Colonel H.E. Timoor al-Daghistani, Princess Basma bint Talal's first husband
  Grand Cordon of the Order of the Star of Jordan
 Princess Muna al-Hussein, mother of King Abdullah of Jordan
  Grand Cordon of the Order of al-Hussein bin Ali
  Special Grand Cordon of the Supreme Order of the Renaissance (25.5.1961)

 United Nations 
 Prince Hamzah bin Hussein, son of Queen Noor of Jordan, half-brother of Abdullah II of Jordan : UN Peacekeeping Medal (2001)

 Asian foreign honours 

 Middle East  

 Bahrain 
 Abdullah II of Jordan : Collar of the Order of al-Khalifa of Bahrain (4.11.1999)
 Queen Rania of Jordan : 1st class of the Order of al-Khalifa (4.11.1999)
 Prince Hamzah bin Hussein, son of Queen Noor of Jordan, half-brother of Abdullah II of Jordan : First class of the Order of Ahmad al-Fateh (8.1999)
 Prince Ghazi bin Muhammad, younger son of Muhammad bin Talal : First Class the Order of Bahrain (2005)

 Imperial State of Iran 
 Prince Hassan bin Talal, youngest brother of King Hussein I of Jordan : Grand Cordon of the Order of the Crown of Iran

 Lebanon 
 Abdullah II of Jordan : Extraordinary Grade of the Order of Merit of Lebanon  (14.9.1999)
 Prince Hassan bin Talal, youngest brother of King Hussein I of Jordan : Grand Cordon of the National Order of the Cedar of the Lebanon

 Oman 
 Prince Ghazi bin Muhammad, younger son of Muhammad bin Talal : First Class the Civil Order of Oman (2003)

 Far East 

 Brunei 
 Queen Noor of Jordan : Senior (Laila Utama) of the Most Esteemed Family Order of Brunei (DK I, 1984)
 Abdullah II of Jordan  : Recipient of the Order of the Crown Royal family of Brunei (DKMB, 13 May 2008)
 Queen Rania of Jordan : Senior (Laila Utama) of the Most Esteemed Royal Family Order of Brunei (DK I, 13.5.2008)
 Princess Aisha bint Hussein, daughter of Princess Muna of Jordan, full-blood sister of Abdullah II and Princess Zein's twin.
 First Class (Dato Paduka Seri Laila Jasa) of the Order of Merit of Brunei (PSLJ) (13.5.2008)
 Princess Zein bint Hussein, daughter of Princess Muna of Jordan, full-blood sister of Abdullah II and Princess Aisha's twin
 First Class (Dato Paduka Seri Laila Jasa) of the Order of Merit of Brunei (PSLJ) (13.5.2008)
 Princess Basma bint Talal, sister of King Hussein I of Jordan : Senior (Laila Utama) of the Most Esteemed Family Order of Brunei (DK I, 22.7.2000)
 H.E. Sayyid Walid al-Kurdi, Princess Basma bint Talal's second husband : First Class (Dato Seri Sitia) of the Order of Loyalty to the State of Brunei (PSNB, 16.7.2002)

 Japan 

 Abdullah II of Jordan : Grand Cross (11.1993) then Collar (30.11.1999) of the Order of the Chrysanthemum
 Queen Rania of Jordan : Grand Cordon of the Order of the Precious Crown (30.11.1999)
 Princess Alia bint Hussein, daughter of Queen Dina of Jordan, half-sister of Abdullah II of Jordan : Grand Cordon of the Order of the Precious Crown (10.3.1976)
 Princess Aisha bint Al Hussein, daughter of Princess Muna of Jordan, Abdullah II's full sister and Princess Zein's twin  : Grand Cordon of the Order of the Precious Crown (30.11.1999)
 Prince Ali bin Hussein, son of Queen Alia of Jordan, half-brother of Abdullah II of Jordan : Order of the Rising Sun
 Prince Hassan bin Talal, youngest brother of King Hussein of Jordan : Grand Cordon of the Order of the Chrysanthemum (6.1970)
 Princess Sarvath al-Hassan, Hassan's wife : Grand Cordon of the Order of the Precious Crown of Japan (4.1988)
 Princess Basma bint Talal, sister of King Hussein of Jordan : Grand Cordon of the Order of the Precious Crown (10.3.1976)

 Kazakhstan 
 Abdullah II of Jordan : Medal for the tenth anniversary of the capital Astana

 Malaysia 
 Princess Muna al-Hussein : Honorary Grand Commander of the Order of the Defender of the Realm (24 April 1965)
 Prince Hassan bin Talal : Honorary Grand Commander of the Order of the Defender of the Realm (24 April 1965)
 Princess Firyal al-Muhammad : Honorary Grand Commander of the Order of the Defender of the Realm (24 April 1965)

 Pakistan 
 Princess Sarvath al-Hassan, Hassan's wife : Hilal-i-Imtiaz award (Crescent of Excellence, 23.3.2002) -- Order of Honour 2nd class (Hilal-i-Imtiaz) 
 Prince Rashid bin Hassan, Hassan's son : Sitara-e-Eisaar award (Star of Sacrifice, 14.2.2007)

 South Korea 
 Abdullah II of Jordan : Knight of Grand Order of Mugunghwa (4.12.1999)

 African foreign honours 

 Egypt 
 Queen Noor of Jordan : Grand Cross of The Virtues (Nishan al-Kemal) (1989)
 Prince Hassan bin Talal, youngest brother of King Hussein I of Jordan : Grand Cordon of the Order of the Nile

 Ethiopian Empire 
 Prince Muhammad bin Talal, eldest younger brother of King Hussein of Jordan : Grand Cross of the Order of the Queen of Sheba

 Libya 
 Abdullah II of Jordan : Grand Conqueror 1st class (1.9.1999)

 Morocco 
 Prince Ghazi bin Muhammad, younger son of Muhammad bin Talal : Grand Cordon of the Order of Muhammad (10.3.2000)

 American foreign honours
 South American foreign honours
 Peru
 Abdullah II of Jordan : Grand Cross of the Order of the Sun of Peru (11.5.2005)

 European foreign honours 

 Austria 

 Queen Noor of Jordan : Grand Star of the Decoration of Honour for Services to the Republic of Austria (1978),
 Abdullah II of Jordan : Grand Star of the Decoration of Honour for Services to the Republic of Austria (2001)
 Prince Hassan bin Talal, King Hussein's youngest brother : Grand Decoration of Honour in Gold with Sash for services to the Republic of Austria (15.10.2004)
 Princess Basma bint Talal, King Hussein's sister : Grand Decoration of Honour in Gold with Sash for Services to the Republic of Austria

 Belgium 

 Abdullah II of Jordan: Grand Cordon of the Order of Leopold.
 Queen Rania of Jordan: Grand Cordon of the Order of Leopold.

 Denmark 

 Queen Noor of Jordan : Knight of the Order of the Elephant of Denmark (27.4.1998)
 Prince Ali bin Hussein, son of Queen Alia of Jordan, half-brother of Abdullah II of Jordan : Grand Cross of the Order of the Dannebrog (27.4.1998)

 France 
 Prince Ali bin Hussein, son of Queen Alia of Jordan, half-brother of Abdullah II of Jordan : Knight of the National Order of the Legion of Honour
 Princess Rym al-Ali, Prince Ali 's wife : Knight of the National Order of the Legion of Honour
 Prince Ghazi bin Muhammad, younger son of Muhammad bin Talal: 
 Grand Cross of the Order of National Merit (16.11.1999)
 Officer (10.3.1997), Commander (20.11.1997), Grand Officer (7.1.2000) of the National Order of the Legion of Honour
 Princess Haya bint Hussein, daughter of Queen Alia of Jordan, half-sister of Abdullah II of Jordan : Officer of the National Order of the Legion of Honour  (6.9.2014)

 Germany 
 Abdullah II of Jordan : Grand Cross Special Class of the Order of Merit of the Federal Republic (21.10.2002)
 Queen Rania of Jordan : Grand Cross Special Class of the Order of Merit of the Federal Republic (21.10.2002)

 Italy 
 Queen Noor of Jordan : Knight Grand Cross of the Order of Merit of the Italian Republic (26.11.1983)
 Abdullah II of Jordan  : Knight Grand Cross (15.1.1987) with Grand Cordon  (9.02.2001) of the Order of Merit of the Italian Republic
 Queen Rania of Jordan : Knight Grand Cross of the Order of Merit of the Italian Republic (19.10.2009)
 Prince Hamzah bin Hussein, son of Queen Noor of Jordan, half-brother of Abdullah II of Jordan : Knight Grand Cross of the Order of Merit of the Italian Republic (14/02/2001)
 Prince Hassan bin Talal, youngest brother of King Hussein I of Jordan : Knight Grand Cross of the Order of Merit of the Italian Republic (26.11.1983)

 Netherlands 

 Abdullah II of Jordan  : 
 Grand Cross of the Order of the Netherlands Lion
 Grand Cross of Order of the House of Orange (7.12.1994)
 Queen Rania of Jordan : Grand Cross of the Order of the Netherlands Lion
 Prince Hamzah bin Hussein, son of Queen Noor of Jordan, half-brother of Abdullah II of Jordan : Grand Cross of the Order of Orange-Nassau (30.10.2006)
 Princess Noor Hamzah, Prince Hamzah's wife : Grand Cross of the Order of Orange-Nassau (30.10.2006)
 Prince Hassan bin Talal, youngest brother of King Hussein I of Jordan : Knight Grand Cross of the Order of Orange-Nassau
 Princess Sarvath al-Hassan, Hassan's wife : Knight Grand Cross of the Order of Orange-Nassau
 Princess Rahma bint Hassan, Hassan's elder daughter : Grand Cross of the Order of Orange-Nassau (30.10.2006)
 Mr. Ala'a Al Batayneh, Princess Rahma's husband : Grand Cross of the Order of Orange-Nassau (30.10.2006)

 Norway 

 Abdullah II of Jordan : Knight Grand Cross with collar of the Royal Norwegian Order of St. Olav (4.4.2000)
 Queen Rania of Jordan : Knight Grand Cross of the Order of St. Olav (4.4.2000)
 Princess Alia bint Hussein, daughter of Queen Dina of Jordan, half-sister of Abdullah II of Jordan : Grand Cross of the Royal Norwegian Order of Merit (4.4.2000)
 Sayyid Mohammed Al-Saleh, Princess Alia's 2nd husband : Grand Cross of the Royal Norwegian Order of Merit (4.4.2000)
 Princess Zein bint Al Hussein, daughter of Princess Muna of Jordan, full sister of Abdullah II and Princess Aisha's twin : Grand Cross of the Royal Norwegian Order of Merit (4.4.2000)
 Sayyid Majdi Al-Saleh, Princess Zein's husband: Grand Cross of the Royal Norwegian Order of Merit (4.4.2000)
 Prince Ali bin Hussein, son of Queen Alia of Jordan, half-brother of Abdullah II of Jordan : Grand Cross of the Royal Norwegian Order of Merit (4.4.2000)
 Prince Hamzah bin Hussein son of Queen Noor of Jordan, half-brother of Abdullah II of Jordan :  Knight Grand Cross with collar of the Order of St. Olav
 Prince Talal bin Muhammad, elder son of Muhammad bin Talal : Grand Cross of the Royal Norwegian Order of Merit (4.4.2000)
 Princess Ghida Talal, Prince Talal's wife : Grand Cross of the Royal Norwegian Order of Merit (4.4.2000)
 Prince Hassan bin Talal, youngest brother of King Hussein of Jordan : Grand Cross of the Order of St. Olav

 Poland 
 Abdullah II of Jordan : Grand Cross of the Order of the White Eagle (26.9.1999)
 Princess Muna al-Hussein: Grand Cross of the Order of the Crown of Romania (1.6.2016)Royal Family of Romania

 Portugal 
 Abdullah II of Jordan :
 Grand Collar of the Order of Prince Henry  (5 March 2008)
 Grand Collar of the Order of Saint James of the Sword  (16 March 2009)
 Queen Rania of Jordan :
 Grand Cross of the Order of Prince Henry  (5 March 2008)
 Grand Cross of the Order of Saint James of the Sword  (16 March 2009)

 Romania 
 Abdullah II of Jordan : Collar of the Order of the Star of Romania (20.12.2005)
 Princess Muna al-Hussein: Grand Cross of the Order of the Crown of Romania (1.6.2016)

 Spain 

 Queen Noor of Jordan : Knight Grand Cross The Order of Isabella the Catholic (22.3.1985)
 Abdullah II of Jordan  : 
 Grand Cross with Collar of the Order of Charles III (21.4.2006)
 Grand Cross with Collar of the Order of Isabel the Catholic (1999)
 Grand Cross of the Order of Naval Merit in white (15.9.1995)
 Grand Cross of the Order of Aeronautical Merit in white (23.12.1999)
 Queen Rania of Jordan : 
 Grand Cross with Collar of the Order of Charles III (21.4.2006)
 Grand Cross of the Order of Isabella the Catholic (18.10.1999)
 Princess Alia bint Hussein, daughter of Queen Dina of Jordan, half-sister of Abdullah II of Jordan : Grand Cross of the Order of Isabella the Catholic (11.11.1994)
 Sayyid Mohammed Al-Saleh, Princess Alia's 2nd husband : Grand Cross of the Order of Civil Merit (18.10.1999)
 Prince Faisal bin Hussein, son of Princess Muna of Jordan, full-blood brother of Abdullah II of Jordan : Knight Grand Cross of the Order of Isabella the Catholic (26.5.2006)
 Princess Alia Tabbaa, Faisal's former wife : Dame Grand Cross of the Order of Isabella the Catholic (26.5.2006)
 Prince Ali bin Hussein, son of Queen Alia of Jordan, half-brother of Abdullah II of Jordan : Knight Grand Cross of the Order of Isabella the Catholic
 Princess Ghida Talal, Prince Talal's wife : Dame Grand Cross of the Order of Isabella the Catholic (2.12.1994)
 Princess Basma bint Talal, sister of King Hussein of Jordan : Dame Grand Cross of the Order of Isabella the Catholic (21.10.1999)
 Colonel H.E. Timoor al-Daghistani, Princess Basma bint Talal's first husband  : Knight Grand Cross of the Order of Isabella the Catholic (21.10.1999)

 Sweden 

 Queen Noor of Jordan : Member of the Royal Order of the Seraphim (15.9.1989)
 Abdullah II of Jordan : Knight of the Royal Order of the Seraphim (7 October 2003)
 Queen Rania of Jordan : Member of the Royal Order of the Seraphim
 Prince Ali bin Hussein, son of Queen Alia of Jordan, half-brother of Abdullah II of Jordan : Commander Grand Cross of the Order of the Polar Star(7.10.2003)
 Prince Hassan bin Talal, youngest brother of King Hussein I of Jordan : Commander Grand Cross of the Order of the Polar Star (8.9.1989)
 Knight of the Royal Order of the Seraphim ???
 Princess Sarvath al-Hassan, Hassan's wife : Commander Grand Cross of the Order of the Polar Star
 Princess Basma bint Talal, sister of King Hussein of Jordan : Commander Grand Cross of the Order of the Polar Star (7.10.2003)

 Ukraine 
 Abdullah II of Jordan : Order of Merit, 1st class & Order of Prince Yaroslav the Wise, 1st class

 United Kingdom 

 Queen Noor of Jordan : 
 Dame Grand Cross of the Venerable Order of Saint John (GCStJ, 16.6.1989)
 Abdullah II of Jordan  : 
 Grand Cross of the Order of the Bath, military class (GCB, 6.11.2001)
 Grand Cross of the Order of St. Michael and St. George  (GCMG, 12.5.1999)
 Honorary Knight Commander of the Royal Victorian Order (KCVO, 26.3.1984)
 Prince Ali bin Hussein, son of Queen Alia of Jordan, half-brother of Abdullah II of Jordan
 Knight Commander of the Royal Victorian Order (KCVO, 6.11.2001)
 Prince Hassan bin Talal, youngest brother of King Hussein I of Jordan
 Knight Grand Cross of the Royal Victorian Order (GCVO, 26.3.1984)
 Princess Basma bint Talal, sister of King Hussein
 Knight Cross of the Royal Victorian Order (GCVO, 6.11.2001)
 Colonel H.E. Timoor al-Daghistani, Princess Basma bint Talal's first husband
 Knight Grand Cross of the Royal Victorian Order (GCVO, 6.11.2001)
 H.E. Sayyid Walid al-Kurdi''', Princess Basma bint Talal's second husband
 Knight Grand Cross of the Royal Victorian Order (GCVO, 6.11.2001)

References 

Jordanian monarchy
Orders, decorations, and medals of Jordan
Jordan